The Scottish Masters, often known by its sponsored names, the Lang's Scottish Masters or the Regal Scottish Masters, was a non-ranking professional snooker tournament held every year from 1981 until 2002, with the exception of 1988.

The tournament was invitational and held in various locations in Scotland, including the Hospitality Inn and the Thistle Hotel (both in Glasgow) and the Motherwell Civic Centre. Following the ban on tobacco advertising, the tournament was unable to find a new sponsor and it was abandoned. It was won three times apiece by Steve Davis, Stephen Hendry and Ronnie O'Sullivan.

A qualifying event was held for the first time in 1995 to select a replacement player for James Wattana who withdrew before the tournament. The event became a fixture from 1997 onwards, with Matthew Stevens becoming the only qualifier to win the main tournament in 1999.

Winners

Qualifying event winners

References

 
Recurring sporting events established in 1981
Recurring sporting events disestablished in 2002
1981 establishments in Scotland
2002 disestablishments in Scotland
Snooker non-ranking competitions
Snooker competitions in Scotland
Defunct snooker competitions
Defunct sports competitions in Scotland